The four hu are a traditional way of classifying syllable finals of Mandarin dialects, including Standard Chinese, based on different glides before the central vowel of the final. They are

 kāikǒu ("open mouth"), finals without a medial
 qíchǐ ("even teeth"), finals beginning with [i]
 hékǒu ("closed mouth"), finals beginning with [u]
 cuōkǒu ("round mouth"), finals beginning with [y]
The terms kāikǒu and hékǒu come from the Song dynasty rime tables describing Middle Chinese.
The Qing phonologist Pan Lei divided each of these categories in two based on the absence or presence of palatalization, and named the two new categories.

This traditional classification is reflected in the bopomofo notation for the finals, but less directly in the pinyin:

Notes

References
 Citations

 Works cited
 
 
 

History of the Chinese language
Traditional Chinese phonology